The 2011 GP Car and Home Players' Championship was a Grand Slam curling bonspiel held at the Crystal Centre in Grande Prairie, Alberta from April 12–17. It features a men's and women's draw, where the top sixteen teams from the Order of Merit rankings for the 2010-11 curling season are invited to compete. It was the final Grand Slam event for the season, and one of the last curling events for the season. The purse for the men's and women's event was CAD$100,000 each.

On the men's side, Kevin Martin won his record seventh Players' championship with a win over Niklas Edin in seven ends, while Jennifer Jones secured her fourth Players' championship with a win over Ontario junior champion Rachel Homan after a big eighth end.

Men

Teams

Knockout brackets

A event

B event

C event

Knockout results

Draw 2
Tuesday, April 12, 8:30 pm

Draw 3
Wednesday, April 13, 10:00 am

Draw 4
Wednesday, April 13, 1:30 pm

Draw 5
Wednesday, April 13, 5:00 pm

Draw 6
Wednesday, April 13, 8:30 pm

Draw 8
Thursday, April 14, 1:30 pm

Draw 9
Thursday, April 14, 5:00 pm

Draw 10
Thursday, April 14, 8:30 pm

Draw 11
Friday, April 15, 10:00 am

Draw 12
Friday, April 15, 1:30 pm

Draw 13
Friday, April 15, 5:00 pm

Draw 15
Saturday, April 16, 10:00 am

Playoffs

Quarterfinals
Saturday, April 16, 5:00 pm

Semifinals
Saturday, April 16, 8:30 pm

Final
Sunday, April 17, 9:30 am

Women

Teams

Knockout brackets

A event

B event

C event

Knockout results

Draw 1
Tuesday, April 12, 5:00 pm

Draw 2
Tuesday, April 12, 8:30 pm

Draw 3
Wednesday, April 13, 10:00 am

Draw 5
Wednesday, April 13, 5:00 pm

Draw 7
Thursday, April 14, 10:00 am

Draw 8
Thursday, April 14, 1:30 pm

Draw 10
Thursday, April 14, 8:30 pm

Draw 11
Friday, April 15, 10:00 am

Draw 12
Friday, April 15, 1:30 pm

Playoffs

Quarterfinals
Friday, April 15, 8:30 pm

Semifinals
Saturday, April 16, 10:00 am

Final
Saturday, April 16, 1:30 pm

Notes

External links
WCT Men's Event Page
WCT Women's Event Page

2011 in Canadian curling
2011 in Alberta
April 2011 sports events in Canada
Sport in Grande Prairie
Curling in Alberta
2011